Sophie Hinchliffe (née Barker), known as Mrs Hinch (born 16 February 1990), is a British influencer whose Instagram account features tips for home cleaning. Her cleaning books and her memoir have been included on the Sunday Times Bestseller List.

Early life 
Hinchliffe was born Sophie Barker, in Basildon, Essex. Before creating her Instagram account, she was a hairdresser. She stated that she suffers from anxiety, and that cleaning helped her cope with it.

Career

Instagram 
Hinchliffe created her Instagram account, mrshinchhome, in March 2018, initially to show how she and her husband were decorating their house. Within two years, she had accumulated two million followers on the platform, known as Hinchers and by the hashtag #HinchArmy. By June 2019 she had 2.5 million followers,  more than 3.8 million. Her content includes stories and short 15-second videos in which she cleans and organises her home. In March 2021, ratings site GoCompare listed her as the highest-paid 'homefluencer' or 'cleanfluencer' in the United Kingdom, second highest worldwide.

Books 
In April 2019, Hinchliffe's first book, Hinch Yourself Happy, sold 160,302 copies in three days, making it the second highest-selling non-fiction book in the UK at that time. Her second book, The Activity Journal, was released in 2019 and reached number 1 on the Sunday Times Bestseller List. Her third book, The Little Book of Lists, became the number one bestseller in the UK in April 2020, boosted by a surge in interest in cleaning and home care following the introduction of coronavirus lockdown restrictions. In October 2020, her memoir, This Is Me, also became a number 1 bestseller.

Other media
This Morning has featured Mrs Hinch's cleaning tips.

In March 2021, Hinchliffe's podcast, All the Best, was recommended by The Guardian as 'podcast of the week'.

Product promotion 
Hinchliffe's recommendations have caused a surge in sales, such as when a cleaning pad she recommended quickly sold out. In 2019, she was investigated by the Advertising Standards Authority for allegedly failing to make legally required disclosures that product promotions on her Instagram were paid advertisements.

Personal life 
Hinchliffe lives in Maldon. She and her husband, Jamie, have two children - Ronnie and Lennie.

Hinchliffe suffered health problems after a gastric band operation that resulted in her losing eight stone. She was prescribed anti-depressants due to anxiety caused by fame and bullying from Internet trolls.

References 

Living people
Social media influencers
1990 births
English women non-fiction writers